Lysyl hydroxylases (or procollagen-lysine 5-dioxygenases) are alpha-ketoglutarate-dependent hydroxylases enzymes that catalyze the hydroxylation of lysine to hydroxylysine. Lysyl hydroxylases require iron and vitamin C as cofactors for their oxidation activity. It takes place (as a post-translational modification) following collagen synthesis in the cisternae (lumen) of the rough endoplasmic reticulum (ER). There are three lysyl hydroxylases (LH1-3) encoded in the human genome, namely: PLOD1, PLOD2 and PLOD3. From PLOD2 two splice variant can be expressed (LH2a and LH2b), where LH2b differs from LH2a by incorporating the small exon 13A. LH1 and LH3 hydroxylate lysyl residues in the collagen triple helix, whereas LH2b hydroxylates lysyl residues in the telopeptides of collagen. In addition to its hydroxylation activity, LH3 has glycosylation activity that produces either monosaccharide (Gal) or disaccharide (Glc-Gal) attached to collagen hydroxylysines.

Collagen lysyl hydroxylation is the first step in collagen pyridinoline cross-linking, that is necessary for the  stabilization of collagen.

Pathology
Mutations in the PLOD1 gene have been linked to kyphoscoliotic Ehlers–Danlos syndrome (kEDS, in the past EDS VI).
Mutations in the PLOD2 gene have been linked to Bruck syndrome in humans.

A deficiency in its cofactor vitamin C is associated with scurvy.

References

External links 
 
 

Human 2OG oxygenases
EC 1.14.11
Extracellular matrix remodeling enzymes